Emil Ratzenhofer (born 2 August 1914, date of death unknown) was an Austrian pair skater. Competing with his sister Herta Ratzenhofer, he won five gold medals at the Austrian Figure Skating Championships. The pair won the bronze medal at the European Figure Skating Championships in 1948 and 1949. They finished ninth at the 1948 Winter Olympics.

Results

Men's singles

Pairs with Herta Ratzenhofer

References

Navigation

1914 births
Year of death missing
Austrian male pair skaters
Olympic figure skaters of Austria
Figure skaters at the 1948 Winter Olympics
European Figure Skating Championships medalists